Calycellinopsis is a fungal genus in the family Helotiaceae. This is a monotypic genus, containing the single species Calycellinopsis xishuangbanna, found in China.

References

Helotiaceae
Monotypic Ascomycota genera